Worthing Golf Club is a golf club on the South Downs at Worthing, England. 
Located close to the Iron Age hill fort of Cissbury Ring in the new South Downs National Park, the club comprises two links golf courses, a 6 hole academy course, a driving range, practice area, two putting greens and a clubhouse.  The club enjoys panoramic views both of the South Downs and the English Channel.

The club was formed in 1905 and its first course, designed by six times Open Championship-winner Harry Vardon was opened in 1906 by Vardon and five-times Open Championship-winner James Braid.

After the First World War, the course was redesigned by golf course designer Harry Colt, who created two courses, a lower and upper course.  The lower course lies mostly in the valley, while the upper course lies across the ridges.

The clubhouse is the original Warren farmhouse.  The club's current professional is Michael Henning.

The golf courses
The Lower Course is the club's most demanding.  It is particularly challenging just before the turn in a valley close to Cissbury Ring known as Deep Bottom.  The Upper Course has the widest panorama, where on the ridge of Mount Carvey the coast can be seen from Beachy Head in the east to the Isle of Wight in the west.

References

External links
Official site
Golf Today
Satellite Images of the golf course

Golf clubs and courses in West Sussex
Buildings and structures in Worthing
Golf clubs and courses designed by Harry Vardon
1905 establishments in England
Sports venues completed in 1905
Sport in Worthing